Annandalea is a genus of Malesian, pyrgomorph grasshoppers in the tribe Tagastini; described by I. Bolívar in 1905.

Species
Annandalea haematoptera (Haan, 1842)
Annandalea robinsoni Bolívar, 1905 - type species

Pyrgomorphidae
Caelifera genera